Robert Leo Farrelly Jr. (born June 17, 1958) is an American film director, screenwriter and producer. He is one of the Farrelly brothers, alongside his brother Peter, and together are known directing and producing quirky, slightly offensive comedy films such as Dumb and Dumber, Shallow Hal, Me, Myself and Irene, There's Something About Mary, and the 2007 remake of The Heartbreak Kid.

Life and career 
Farrelly was raised in Cumberland, Rhode Island, to Mariann, a nurse practitioner, and Dr. Robert Leo Farrelly. His grandparents were Irish immigrants, and he also has Polish ancestry. He is a graduate of Rensselaer Polytechnic Institute, where he entered the school on a hockey scholarship.

Bobby and his brother Peter Farrelly are known as the Farrelly brothers. They have written, directed and produced several comedy films  including Dumb and Dumber, There's Something About Mary, Kingpin, Shallow Hal, Me, Myself & Irene and Stuck on You, as well as Fever Pitch, and  The Lost Son of Havana.  They conceived the Seinfeld episode "The Virgin" (4.10)

In 2014, Bobby and Peter  directed Dumb and Dumber To, the sequel to their 1994 blockbuster hit Dumb and Dumber.

In 2016, Bobby directed two episodes of Season 10 of the Canadian cult mockumentary TV series Trailer Park Boys.

In 2020, Bobby and Peter directed the Quibi comedy series The Now.

Personal life 
Farrelly has been married to his wife Nancy since 1990; they have two sons and a daughter. One of Farrelly's sons is transgender comedian A.B. Farrelly.

References

External links 

1958 births
American film producers
American male screenwriters
American television directors
American television producers
American people of Irish descent
Comedy film directors
Living people
Rensselaer Polytechnic Institute alumni
RPI Engineers men's ice hockey players
People from Providence County, Rhode Island
People from Cumberland, Rhode Island
Film directors from Rhode Island
Screenwriters from Rhode Island

it:Bobby Farrelly